Maurice Gibson Holmes (born 19 May 1990) is an English cricketer. Holmes is a right-handed batsman who bowls right-arm off break. He was born at Tenterden, Kent, and educated at Tonbridge School, where he was a music scholar.

Holmes first came to the public eye in 2009. At this time he was playing for the Kent Second XI, but during the 2009 World Twenty20 he bowled to the New Zealand team during their practice sessions. His bowling impressed then New Zealand coach Andy Moles and then captain Daniel Vettori, who likened his bowling to that of Muttiah Muralitharan. On the back of this he was flown out to Sri Lanka for New Zealands 2009 tour to bowl at the New Zealand players, as well as working with New Zealands then spin consultant, Saqlain Mushtaq.

However, it wouldn't be until 2011 while studying for his degree at Loughborough University, that he made his first-class debut for Loughborough MCCU, taking 3-46 on debut against Northamptonshire and making a further appearance against Leicestershire. Signed by Warwickshire for the 2011 season, he made his first-class debut for the county against Durham MCCU, in the process taking a wicket with his first ball. Holmes made a further first-class appearance for the county against Lancashire in the County Championship. His List A debut came against Leicestershire in the Clydesdale Bank 40 taking 2-47 from 8 overs in a narrow victory by 9 runs. Holmes made two further List A appearances for Warwickshire in 2011, against Scotland and Northamptonshire, both in the Clydesdale Bank 40.

However, in June 2011 he was twice reported by umpires for a suspected illegal bowling action, with particular concern surrounding his doosra delivery. On 8 July, the England and Wales Cricket Board suspended Holmes from bowling following an independent analysis of his bowling action, deeming it to be illegal. He was released by Warwickshire at the end of the 2011 season. Following a period of remedial work on his bowling action, it was deemed that his standard delivery was legal, but his doosra was not. Following these findings, Holmes' suspension was lifted, but he was warned against bowling his doosra in competitive county cricket.

He took a year out of his studies at Loughborough University in 2012 to concentrate on resurrecting his county career, travelling to the Global Cricket School in Pune, India, to work on his bowling action.

Soon after, however, Holmes adjourned his time in cricket to pursue a career as a practising barrister. He was called to the Bar by Lincoln's Inn in 2015.

References

External links
Maurice Holmes at ESPNcricinfo
Maurice Holmes at CricketArchive

1990 births
Living people
People from Tenterden
People educated at Tonbridge School
Alumni of Loughborough University
English cricketers
Loughborough MCCU cricketers
Warwickshire cricketers
English barristers
Members of Lincoln's Inn